The Hainan Centre for the Performing Arts is located at 68 Guoxing Avenue in Haikou, Hainan, China. The entire facility is 25,000 m2, with an 8,253 m2 auxiliary space, and an actual theatre space of 2,657 m2. The venue can accommodate up to 1,230 people. The cost of construction was 200 million yuan.

The facility is one of three large, cultural infrastructure projects constructed around the same time on Guoxing Avenue alongside one another, the others being Hainan Provincial Museum and Hainan Provincial Library.

In September 2010, the theatre was completed in, and on October 1, 2010, the premiere was held.

References

External links

 Official website

Theatres completed in 2010
Buildings and structures in Haikou
Tourist attractions in Haikou
Performing arts venues in China
2010 establishments in China